Merophyas petrochroa is a species of moth of the  family Tortricidae. It is found in Australia, where it has been recorded from Victoria and South Australia.

The wingspan is about 15 mm.

References

	

Moths described in 1908
Archipini